NGC 321 is an elliptical galaxy located in the constellation Cetus. It was discovered on September 27, 1864, by the astronomer Albert Marth.

It was the location of the planet Eminiar VII in the original series Star Trek episode "A Taste of Armageddon" (where it was incorrectly identified as a star cluster).

References

External links 
 

Elliptical galaxies
Cetus (constellation)
0321
18640927
003443